It's a Great Life (also known in syndicated reruns as The Bachelors) is an American situation comedy which aired on NBC from 1954 to 1956.  Frances Bavier, six years before being cast as Aunt Bee  in CBS's The Andy Griffith Show, played a somewhat similar role as Mrs. Amy Morgan, the owner of a boarding house. The series also starred three comedic actors, James Dunn, William Bishop, and Michael O'Shea.

Notes

References

External links
 

1954 American television series debuts
1956 American television series endings
1950s American sitcoms
Black-and-white American television shows
English-language television shows
NBC original programming
Television shows set in California
Works about veterans